Ola may refer to:

Places

Panama
Olá, a subdistrict in Coclé Province
Olá District

Russia
Ola, Russia, an urban settlement in Magadan Oblast
Ola District, an administrative division in Magadan Oblast
Ola (river),  a river in Magadan Oblast

United States
Ola, Arkansas, a city
Ola, Georgia, an unincorporated community
Ola, Idaho, an unincorporated community
Ola, South Dakota, a census-designated place
Ola, Kaufman County, Texas, an unincorporated community
Casa Linda Estates, Dallas, formerly known as Ola

People
 Ola (given name), a list of men and women with the name
 Ola (surname), a list of men and women with the surname
 Ola Svensson (born 1986), also known by the mononym Ola, Swedish singer-songwriter
 Ola Nordmann, a national personification of Norwegians
 Ola people, another name for the Wurla, an indigenous people of Western Australia

Other uses
Ola High School (disambiguation), the name of several high schools
Ola Cabs, an Indian online cab aggregator 
Olá, an ice cream brand owned by Unilever
Ola, former name of Colombia Móvil mobile phone company
Ola (album), by Ola Svensson (2010)
Ola, an audience wave
Ola station, a railway station in the Basque Country, Spain
Ola, a synonym for the fly genus Rutilotrixa

See also
Olaf (disambiguation)
Oola (disambiguation)
Aulakh